Baya, Afghanistan may refer to:
Bayah, Afghanistan, a town in Badghis Province
Baya, Sar-e Pol, a village

See also
Baya (disambiguation)
Bayah (disambiguation)